Myotome is the group of muscles that a single spinal nerve root innervates. 

In other usage, Myotome may refer to:
 Myotome of a somite